Patricia Kalesanwo is a Nigerian communication expert, journalist and the first female registrar of the Nigerian Institute of Journalism. She holds a masters degree in Adult education (Communication Arts) from the University of Ibadan, Ibadan, South West, Nigeria. She was the Students' Affairs Officer of the institute before her appointment as the acting registrar of the institution on 28 February 2020 and later confirmed as the substantive registrar of the institute on 17 March 2021.

References 

Living people
Nigerian journalists
Year of birth missing (living people)